Teen Angel is an American teen fantasy serial drama series that aired on The Disney Channel. Starring Jason Priestley, the series was first broadcast on The All-New Mickey Mouse Club (MMC) on April 24, 1989, and ended its run on May 22, 1989.

Synopsis
Priestley stars as a 1950s teenage guardian angel named Buzz Gunderson who was killed in a car wreck in 1959. Buzz was given various assignments and tasks he was to complete in order to get into heaven.

Sequel: Teen Angel Returns
Teen Angel was followed by a sequel series, Teen Angel Returns, also starring Priestley and future Beverly Hills, 90210 co-star Jennie Garth, which aired from October 2 to October 22, 1989. Theme for both series was from the recording by Mark Dinning. Parts of the series were filmed in Salt Lake City, Utah, Bountiful High School Gym (Utah), and Ogden, Utah.

Cast 
 Jason Priestley as Buzz Gunderson
 Adam Biesk as Dennis Mullen
 Nancy Borgenicht as Mrs. Henderson
 Hunter Mackenzie Austin as Carolyn
 Renee O'Connor as Nancy Nichols
 Sasha Jenson as Jason

See also
Teen Angel (1997 TV series) – a comedic take on a similar plot, aired on ABC
Out of the Blue – one of many spin-off sitcoms connected to the sitcom Happy Days

References

External links
 

1989 American television series debuts
1989 American television series endings
1980s American teen drama television series
American fantasy television series
Angels in television
Disney Channel original programming
English-language television shows
Serial drama television series
Television series about angels
Television series about teenagers
Television series by Disney
The Mickey Mouse Club serials
Television shows filmed in Utah